Arsim Plepolli (born 11 April 1977), also referred as Arsim Prepolli, is a Kosovan professional football coach and former player who is the current assistant manager of Prishtina.

Career
He initially played for KF Flamurtari from Pristina in Football Superleague of Kosovo, and later for many football clubs as Željezničar and Bosna Visoko in the Bosnian Premier League, Aluminium Hormozgan in the Azadegan League, Olimpija Ljubljana, KF Elbasani, etc. Plepolli joined Aluminium Hormozgan in 2009 after spending the previous seasons at KF KEK in Kosovo and KS Elbasani

Honours

Player
Željezničar
Bosnian Premier League: 2001–02
Bosnian Supercup: 2000

Besa Pejë
Kosovo Superleague: 2006–07

References

External links
 Profile at Footballdatabase.
 Stats from Slovenia at PrvaLiga.

1977 births
Living people
Sportspeople from Pristina
Kosovo Albanians
Association football forwards
Kosovan footballers
NK Olimpija Ljubljana (1945–2005) players
NK Bosna Visoko players
SV Spittal players
KF Besa players
KF Elbasani players
Aluminium Hormozgan F.C. players
KF KEK players
SC Gjilani players
Slovenian PrvaLiga players
Football Superleague of Kosovo players
Kosovan expatriate footballers
Expatriate footballers in Slovenia
Kosovan expatriate sportspeople in Slovenia
Expatriate footballers in Bosnia and Herzegovina
Kosovan expatriate sportspeople in Bosnia and Herzegovina
Expatriate footballers in Austria
Kosovan expatriate sportspeople in Austria
Expatriate footballers in Albania
Kosovan expatriate sportspeople in Albania
Expatriate footballers in Iran
Kosovan expatriate sportspeople in Iran